Versão Acústica is the first album by Brazilian Acoustic rock musician Emmerson Nogueira. It features covers of hits from many famous bands and musicians, like Pink Floyd, Eric Clapton, Deep Purple and Simon & Garfunkel.

Track listing

Personnel 
Emmerson Nogueira - vocals, backing vocals, Acoustic guitar, Twelve string guitar, Lap steel guitar, Bass guitar
David Villefort - drums
Vanessa Farias - Lead Vocals, backing vocals
Sarah Mendonça - Vocals
Messias Lott – Bass guitar
Caco Scarlatelli – 12 string guitar
Ney Leme – Lap steel guitar

Emmerson Nogueira albums
2001 debut albums
Sony Music Brazil albums